The 2001 Super League Grand Final was the Fourth official Grand Final and the conclusive and championship-deciding match of Super League VI. The match was held on Saturday 13 October 2001 at Old Trafford, Manchester, and was contested by Bradford Bulls and Wigan Warriors. Refereed by Stuart Cummings, 60,164 saw Bradford Bulls win 37 - 6.

Background

Tetleys Super League VI was the fourth and final time the top five playoff system would be used and the first season relegation was reintroduced with Huddersfield Giants again finishing bottom and relegated. Bradford Bulls finished top for a third time.

Route to the Final

Bradford Bulls
Bradford finished first in the table so they automatically qualified for the play-off semi-finals where they had a home time against Wigan at Odsal Stadium. Bradford won 24–18 to qualify for the Grand Final.

Wigan Warriors

The play-off system in use only gave the league leaders a bye to the semi-finals. Wigan had finished second so had to play a qualifying play-off first. Drawn at home to Hull F.C. Wigan won a close game 27–24 to go through to the semi-final. This was an away fixture to Bradford where they were beaten 24–18. However this loss did not end their season. The losers of the qualifying semi-final got another chance by playing the winners of the other semi-final in a final eliminator. Therefore, Saints' third play-off game was a home tie against St Helens where they won through 44–10.

Match details

References

External links
2001 Super League Grand Final at rlphotos.com

Wigan Warriors matches
Bradford Bulls matches
Super League Grand Finals
Grand final